{{DISPLAYTITLE:Tau7 Eridani}}

Tau7 Eridani is a solitary star in the constellation Eridanus. It is visible to the naked eye with an apparent visual magnitude of 5.235. Using the parallax method, the distance to this star can be estimated as around 251 light years.

This is an A-type main sequence star with a stellar classification of A3 Vs, where the 's' indicates it has narrow absorption lines. It may be a chemically peculiar Am star, which means it displays unusual abundances of certain elements in its surface layers. Tau7 Eridani appears to be a low amplitude variable that displays slight fluctuations in luminosity over a period of 7.17 days. It is slowly rotating with a projected rotational velocity of 18 km/s, and is around 387 million years old.

References

A-type main-sequence stars
Eridanus (constellation)
Eridani, Tau7
Eridani, 28
023878
017717
1181
Durchmusterung objects